Gardner Municipal Airport  is a public airport located one mile (2 km) west of the central business district of Gardner, a city in Johnson County, Kansas, United States. It is publicly owned by the City of Gardner.

Facilities and aircraft 

 Runway 3/21: 2,154 x 80 ft (657 x 24 m), surface: turf
 Runway 8/26: 2,960 x 39 ft (902 x 12 m), surface: asphalt
 Runway 17/35: 3,373 x 90 ft (1,028 x 27 m), surface: turf

For the 12-month period ending April 30, 2004, the airport had 51,500 general aviation aircraft operations, an average of 141 per day. There are 96 aircraft based at this airport: 90 single-engine, 4 ultralights and 2 gliders.

References

External links

Airports in Kansas
Buildings and structures in Johnson County, Kansas